Fábrica Nacional de Motores (FNM) was a Brazilian manufacturer of engines and motor vehicles based in the Xerém district of Duque de Caxias near Rio de Janeiro that operated between 1942 and 1988. In 2018, the manufacturer was refounded, changing its name to Fábrica Nacional de Mobilidades (English: "National Factory of  Mobilities") based in Rio de Janeiro and producing electric trucks at the Agrale factory in Rio Grande do Sul.

Origins
The company was created 1942 by the Brazilian state as part of the Estado Novo agenda of President Getúlio Vargas. It was one of several business launched by the state during this period (including also Companhia Siderúrgica Nacional launched in 1941 and CHESF in the later 1940s) to kick start an industrial sector in Brazil. Initially the company produced American Curtiss-Wright aircraft engines under license along with ammunition, bicycles, spindles and refrigerators.

After the Second World War it decided to diversify its production. The government was keen to launch a vehicle manufacturing industry. In 1949, an agreement was reached with the Italian manufacturer Isotta Fraschini, whereby FNM would produce the Milanese company's heavy trucks under license. Isotta Fraschini commercial vehicles enjoyed an excellent reputation at this time, but the Italian company was already economically troubled, although its formal bankruptcy would be put off till the end of 1951.

The Alfa Romeo connection

The disappearance of Isotta Fraschini as a vehicle manufacturer left FNM looking for a new technology partner. In 1952, an agreement was signed with Alfa Romeo, another Milanese vehicle manufacturer. Unusually in Europe, Alfa Romeo was (like FNM) a state owned business, following bankruptcy and a government rescue in the 1930s. Under the agreement with Alfa Romeo, FNM would manufacture Alfa Romeo's commercial vehicle range under license. Though little known north of the Alps, Alfa Romeo commercial vehicles were well established in Italy, and other south European markets. Between 1956 and 1960, FNM built more than 15,000 heavy trucks of Alfa Romeo design: it also manufactured the chassis for buses and coaches. In the Brazilian heavy truck sector which FNM dominated till the early 1970s, FNM was initially the only manufacturer. Trucks produced by FNM were generally nicknamed "Fenemê".

In the mid-fifties a company called Fabral S.A. (Fábrica Brasileira de Automóveis Alfa, "the Brazilian Alfa automobile factory"), a collaboration between Alfa Romeo and Brazilian investor Matarazzo, was set up to build the Alfa Romeo 2000 (tipo 102/B, "B" for Brazil). The car was to be built in Jacareí, in the state of São Paulo. The Matarazzo Group backed out in 1958, following troubled discussions about the suitability of building luxurious cars in poor Brazil. After pressure from then-President Juscelino Kubitschek FNM, in which Alfa Romeo already held a minority interest, took over the project. In 1960 FNM's first passenger car was launched, the FNM 2000, a Brazilian version of the series 102 Alfa Romeo 2000 four-door sedan (berlina). The factory ended up being built in the Xerém neighborhood of Duque de Caxias, Rio de Janeiro instead. The engine was the same 1,975 cc twin camshaft unit found in the Italian product, but detuned to produce only  and the car received the FNM logo. This series of cars was named "J.K." in honor of President Kubitschek who had helped make the deal take place. This was by far the most luxurious, and most expensive, car built in Brazil in the period.

A coupé version was offered from 1966. Known as the FNM Onça ("Jaguar"), the coupé did not follow the line of any Alfa Romeo  design, but featured a locally designed body unmistakably reminiscent of the original Ford Mustang. The regular FNM 2000, meanwhile, was followed by more powerful versions, culminating with the  TIMB ("Turismo Internazional Modelo Brasileiro"), now boasting usefully more power than was claimed for its Alfa Romeo cousins of the time. The TIMB also featured a flat bonnet with a lower-mounted grille, as suggested by Lincoln Tendler aiming a better aerodynamic penetration, and a divided front bumper to accommodate the lower centerpiece. This same front design was also used for the succeeding FNM 2150, with some detail differences.

Alfa Romeo control

In 1968, Alfa Romeo acquired a controlling share in the hitherto state-owned FNM business. The next year the FNM 2000 was replaced by a restyled version, the FNM 2150, the most obvious visual differences affecting the front of the car. For this application the twin camshaft four cylinder engine saw its capacity increased to 2132 cc, and performance was further enhanced through the installation of a better set of carburetors. The five-speed gearbox was the same one used in all cars made up to that moment. The FNM 2150 would continue in production from 1969 till 1974.

In 1971, another coupé called the Furia GT 2150 was presented to the public. Based on chassis and mechanics of the FNM/JK 2150 cc model, the car was designed by Brazilian designer Toni Bianco. Only a few hand built examples were produced, but the stylish coupé may have helped the public image of the by now aging design of the mainstream FNM 2150. Bianco later made some sporting creations carrying his own name.

Alfa Romeo had disposed of its commercial vehicle operations in Italy in the 1960s, and in 1973 the FNM commercial vehicle business was sold to Fiat's industrial vehicle division, while Alfa Romeo retained responsibility for the FNM automobile business – subsequently FNM's commercial vehicle business ended up being absorbed into Fiat's Brazilian Iveco business.

Closing chapter

In 1974, saw the FNM 2150 replaced with the Alfa Romeo 2300. This was the end for the FNM badged cars: the FNM badge itself, obviously inspired by the Alfa Romeo badge, was also replaced on this car with an actual Alfa Romeo badge. The general look of the new car was very similar to that of the Italian built Alfetta sedan, designed by Giuseppe Scarnati and first offered in Europe in 1972, although the Brazilian car was actually  longer and  wider than the Alfetta. Under the skin, the 2300 was based technically on the older Alfa Romeo 1900. The gear box of the 2300 was conventionally located adjacent to the engine and not (as with the Alfetta) across the rear axle. A maximum speed of 170 km/h (106 mph) was claimed. For the 1985 model year, the 2300 was renamed as "Alfa Romeo 85". This model was manufactured until November 1986.

Marketing opportunities were identified in Europe where Alfa Romeo's locally designed attempt to move upmarket had made little impact on the competition from Bavaria:  the Brazilian Alfa Romeo was offered briefly in 1981, under the designation Alfa Rio and distributed by Alfa Romeo Germany. Additionally, around 600 of the cars were shipped to The Netherlands.

The end and the resurgence 
Alfa Romeo faced difficulties in Europe during the late 1970s and early 1980s, coming under increasing commercial pressure from the three largest German up-market auto producers even in Italy. Objective financial data concerning nationalized businesses are seldom published, but Alfa Romeo is believed to have operated at a substantial loss for much of its time under state control: in 1986, Romano Prodi who was at the time chairman of the IRI (the government body responsible for nationalised industries in Italy), wishing to reduce the losses of the IRI, transferred Alfa Romeo to the private sector, which in Italy's mass market automobile business meant at this time Fiat. 

Since 1976, Fiat had been developing its own Brazilian operation, based in Betim. The Brazilian-based car business that had formerly comprised FNM was accordingly integrated into Fiat's own Brazilian operation, and in 1988, the FNM badged commercial vehicles – already produced by a Fiat owned business since Alfa Romeo sold the business in 1973 – were rebadged as Iveco products. over four years the Brazilian brand has been refounded by Zeca Martins and Alberto Martins. the new trucks will be 100% electric geared towards urban transport, mainly drinks, Uses state-of-the-art technologies, with a tablet connected to operational IT and to the companies' logistics systems, including monitoring, innovative video-telematics solutions from artificial intelligence collision cameras, lane change, vehicle departure alert ahead , distracted and smoking driver alert, accelerometer, red traffic light advance, minimum distance warning of vehicles in traffic, collision risk warning, virtual bumpers, high-resolution screen at the rear, which can transmit camera image from the front or advertisements, recognition of traffic signs, warning of danger of collision with motorcycles and bicycles and four cameras – two side, front and rear. Everything being transmitted in real time to the fleet management center and to the ‘FNM cloud’… And with everything ready to become an ‘autonomous truck’ in the future ”, explains Marco Aurélio Rozo, director of Information Technology at FNM and boast a "vintage" 1960s cabin with 350 horsepower.

Automobile production volumes
Production volumes of the FNM 2000/2150, to the extent these can be determined:

 1966:   474
 1967:   714
 1968:
 1969:   555
 1970: 1,209
 1971:   ~800
 1972:   525
 1978:   4,017
 1979:   2,350

Models manufactured

Trucks

 FNM D-7300
 FNM D-9500
 FNM D-11000
 FNM 180
 FNM 210

Passenger cars

 1960   FNM 2000 J.K.
 1966   FNM 2000 Onça
 1966   FNM 2000 TiMB
 1969-1972   FNM 2150
 1974   Alfa Romeo 2300
 1977   Alfa Romeo 2300 B
 1978   Alfa Romeo 2300 ti
 1980   Alfa Romeo 2300 sl
 1980-1986 Alfa Romeo 2300 ti4

Automobile technical data

References
 Automobil Revue, Katalognummern 1968 bis 1973 (technical data)
 auto katalog, 1985/86 edition (ti4 data)

Notes

External links

FNM - Fabrica Nacional de Motores in Xerém, Rio de Janeiro:The beginning of aviation and automotive industry in Brasil
FMTSP Museum 
Documents and photos 
Documents  
Brazilian FNM 2300 website 

Alfa Romeo
Brazilian brands
Companies based in Rio de Janeiro (state)
Defunct motor vehicle manufacturers of Brazil
Defunct aircraft engine manufacturers of Brazil
Defunct defence companies of Brazil
Defence companies of Brazil
Engineering companies of Brazil
Manufacturing companies established in 1942
Vehicle manufacturing companies established in 1942
Vehicle manufacturing companies disestablished in 1988
Truck manufacturers of Brazil
1942 establishments in Brazil
1988 disestablishments in Brazil